Mouhamed Diop may refer to:
 Mouhamed Diop (swimmer)
 Mouhamed Diop (footballer)

See also
 Mohamed Diop, Senegalese basketball player